Softie is a 2021 French coming-of-age drama film written and directed by Samuel Theis. It follows a troubled ten-year-old boy living with his mother and two siblings in Forbach, northeastern France. It premiered in the International Critics' Week sidebar at the 2021 Cannes Film Festival, and won the top prize at the 2021 Thessaloniki International Film Festival.

Cast
 Aliocha Reinert as Johnny
 Antoine Reinartz as Adamski
 Mélissa Olexa as Sonia
 Izïa Higelin as Nora
 Jade Schwartz as Mélissa
 Ilario Gallo as Dylan
 Abdel Benchendikh as Ylies
 Romande Esch as Dylan's girlfriend
 Mérésia Litzenburger as Mérésia
 Danielle Dalhem as school principal
 Maïa Quesmand as Camille
 Claire Burger as Claire

Reception
Nikki Baughan of Screen International found the film reminiscent of System Crasher and wrote, "it expertly captures [the protagonist's] confusion, fear and anger as he attempts to negotiate both the hardships of life and his burgeoning sexuality." Pat Brown of Slant Magazine called the film "a noteworthy repurposing of the coming-of-age social drama" that provides "a straightforward glance into the experience of navigating a queer identity", giving it two and a half out of four stars.

References

External links
 

2021 films
2021 drama films
2021 LGBT-related films
2020s coming-of-age drama films
French coming-of-age drama films
French LGBT-related films
2020s French-language films
Films set in France
Films shot in France
2020s French films